Floris Venter (born 7 May 1886, date of death unknown) was a South African cyclist. He competed in five events at the 1908 Summer Olympics.

References

External links
 

1886 births
Year of death missing
South African male cyclists
Olympic cyclists of South Africa
Cyclists at the 1908 Summer Olympics
Place of birth missing